KPXO-TV (channel 66) is a television station licensed to Kaneohe, Hawaii, United States, serving the Hawaiian Islands as an affiliate of Ion Television. Owned by Inyo Broadcast Holdings, KPXO-TV maintains offices on Waimanu Street in Honolulu. Its primary transmitter is located north of Kailua, with a secondary transmitter in Akupu, Hawaii.

KPXO-TV was a charter affiliate of the network when it began as Pax TV in 1998. Even though it does not have any satellite stations, KPXO-TV is available on cable statewide.

Technical information

Subchannels
The station's digital signal is multiplexed:

Analog-to-digital conversion
In 2009, KPXO left analog channel 66, continuing on digital channel 41 when the analog to digital conversion was completed.

On April 13, 2017, the FCC announced that KPXO-TV will relocate to RF channel 32 by April 12, 2019 as a result of the broadcast incentive auction.

References

External links

PXO-TV
Ion Television affiliates
Court TV affiliates
Grit (TV network) affiliates
Ion Mystery affiliates
Defy TV affiliates
TrueReal affiliates
Scripps News affiliates
Television channels and stations established in 1998
1998 establishments in Hawaii